Paronychia is a genus of plants in the family Caryophyllaceae with over 110 species worldwide, mostly from warm-temperate North America, Eurasia, South America and Africa. They are herbs that are annual or biennial or perennial in life span. Some species have a woody base. For the most part they have small, white to yellow-white colored flowers that are often hidden within the paired bracts.

The genus Siphonychia has been incorporated into Paronychia by botanists.

The common names for some of the species include chickweed, nailwort, and Whitlow-wort. The genus gets its name from the disease of the fingernails which it was once thought to cure. Traditional healers in modern-day use species of this genus to treat kidney stones.

Selected species
Paronychia ahartii – Ahart's nailwort
Paronychia argentea – Algerian tea
Paronychia argyrocoma – Silvery nailwort
Paronychia canadensis – smooth-forked nailwort
Paronychia chartacea – paper nailwort
Paronychia drummondii – Drummond's nailwort
Paronychia fastigiata – hairy-forked nailwort
Paronychia franciscana – San Francisco nailwort
Paronychia jamesii – James' nailwort
Paronychia palaestina
Paronychia rugelii  – Rugel's nailwort
Paronychia sessiliflora – creeping nailwort
Paronychia virginica – Virginia nailwort or Yellow nailwort

References

External links

USDA Plants Profile: North American species

 
Caryophyllaceae genera
Taxa named by Philip Miller